Adanac is a family-run tourist cottage business on Lake Temagami in northeastern Ontario.  Adanac is in the Town of Temagami, in the District of Nipissing.  The name is derived from Canada, spelled backwards.

Communities in Nipissing District
Localities of Temagami